Derrick Tyrone Gaffney (born May 24, 1955) is an American former college and professional football player who was a wide receiver in the National Football League (NFL) for eight seasons during the 1970s and 1980s.  Gaffney played college football for the University of Florida, and thereafter, he played professionally for the New York Jets of the NFL.

Early years 

Gaffney was born in Jacksonville, Florida in 1955.  He attended William M. Raines High School in Jacksonville, and he played high school football for the Raines Vikings.

College career 

Gaffney accepted an athletic scholarship to attend the University of Florida in Gainesville, Florida, where he played for coach Doug Dickey's Florida Gators football team from 1974 to 1977.  Memorably, Gaffney caught a ninety-nine-yard touchdown reception from Cris Collinsworth in the Gators' 48–3 victory over the Rice Owls in 1977, which tied the then-current NCAA record and remains the longest touchdown pass in Southeastern Conference (SEC) history.  While he was a Florida undergraduate, Gaffney was also a member of Alpha Phi Alpha Fraternity.

Professional career 

Gaffney started sixty-eight of 100 games in which he played for the Jets, and finished his NFL career with 156 receptions for 2,613 yards and seven touchdowns.

Gaffney football family 

Gaffney's older brother, Don Gaffney, was the starting quarterback for the Florida Gators from the middle of the 1973 season through the end of 1975, and was the first African-American to become the starter at the quarterback position for the Gators.  Gaffney is also the father of former NFL wide receiver Jabar Gaffney and the uncle of former NFL cornerback Lito Sheppard.  Both Jabar Gaffney and Lito Sheppard played for the Florida Gators in the early 2000s.

See also 

 Florida Gators football, 1970–79
 List of Alpha Phi Alpha brothers
 List of Florida Gators in the NFL Draft
 List of New York Jets players

References

Bibliography 

 Carlson, Norm, University of Florida Football Vault: The History of the Florida Gators, Whitman Publishing, LLC, Atlanta, Georgia (2007).  .
 Golenbock, Peter, Go Gators!  An Oral History of Florida's Pursuit of Gridiron Glory, Legends Publishing, LLC, St. Petersburg, Florida (2002).  .
 Hairston, Jack, Tales from the Gator Swamp: A Collection of the Greatest Gator Stories Ever Told, Sports Publishing, LLC, Champaign, Illinois (2002).  .
 McCarthy, Kevin M.,  Fightin' Gators: A History of University of Florida Football, Arcadia Publishing, Mount Pleasant, South Carolina (2000).  .
 Nash, Noel, ed., The Gainesville Sun Presents The Greatest Moments in Florida Gators Football, Sports Publishing, Inc., Champaign, Illinois (1998).  .

1955 births
Living people
African-American players of American football
American football wide receivers
Florida Gators football players
New York Jets players
Players of American football from Jacksonville, Florida
William M. Raines High School alumni
National Football League replacement players
21st-century African-American people
20th-century African-American sportspeople